Melody Ann "Dot" Gard (née Coleman; 28 February 1936 – 1 September 2015) was a New Zealand fencer.

She won the gold medal in the women's individual foil at the 1962 British Empire and Commonwealth Games. She represented Australia at the 1966 British Empire and Commonwealth Games where she won a silver medal.

References

1936 births
2015 deaths
New Zealand female foil fencers
Fencers at the 1962 British Empire and Commonwealth Games
Fencers at the 1966 British Empire and Commonwealth Games
Commonwealth Games gold medallists for New Zealand
Commonwealth Games silver medallists for Australia
Commonwealth Games medallists in fencing
20th-century New Zealand women
21st-century New Zealand women
Medallists at the 1962 British Empire and Commonwealth Games
Medallists at the 1966 British Empire and Commonwealth Games